Consumer Electronics ATA (CE-ATA) is an interface standard for the connection of storage devices and hosts in consumer electronic device such as mobile and handheld devices. One of the primary goals is to standardize connections for small form factor hard disk drives such as 1-inch Microdrives.

The standard is maintained by CE-ATA Workgroup.

History 
The CE-ATA Specification was developed in 2005.

Interface

MMC 
CE-ATA is electrically and physically compatible with MMC specification. CE-ATA uses MMC connector on host devices and matching flex cable or circuit connection on CE-ATA hard disk drives.

Pin Assignment

See also
AT Attachment (ATA)
MMC

External links
CE-ATA Workgroup 
CE-ATA Digital Protocol Specification Revision 1.1 
MultiMediaCard Association

AT Attachment